"Don't You Remember When" is a song written by Lynsey de Paul and Barry Blue, that was released as a single by Vera Lynn on 20 February 1976 on the EMI record label, in the UK as well as in Europe. The song was recorded at the Marquee Studios, London and was produced by de Paul and she also sang backing vocals on the track. Ringo Starr, who was de Paul's boyfriend at the time, played the tambourine on the song, with Lynn recently recalling this in a 2019 interview in Saga Magazine. The music collectors magazine "Goldmine" listed it as one of Starr's 5 greatest session performances. De Paul also produced the B-side of the single, "That Old Feeling", written by Lew Brown and Sammy Fain. The English keyboard player, pianist and composer Tony Hymas, who had worked with de Paul before on her Love Bomb album and who went on to be a member of the duo Ph.D., arranged the song. The song received favourable reviews, with the  Record Mirror writing that the song is "a perfect vehicle for her with a well-honed nostalgic lyrics and lots of big long notes".

De Paul was interviewed about how she wrote the song with Barry Blue especially for Vera Lynn, after appearing on Lynn's TV show, as well as details about its recording in an article in the UK music magazine, Music Week. Lynn and de Paul held a press reception at the Dorchester Hotel in February 1976 to announce the release of the single. The two ladies had also met previously at the Dorchester Hotel when they were both recipients of Ivor Novello Awards on 22 May 1975; de Paul receiving the Best Television Theme award for the song "No, Honestly", and Lynn receiving a special award for services to the music industry. Lynn performed the song on her TV show.

The song appeared on CD for the first time in 2007 as a remastered track (with the shortened title "Don't You Remember") on the Vera Lynn compilation album, The Singles Collection, that was released worldwide to coincide for her 90th birthday on the EMI Gold record label and on Parlophone in digital download format. The extensive sleeve notes for the CD states "The last tracks not to appear on an album were issued in the same year and really are the diamonds among the collected pearls on this collection. Singer-songwriter Lynsey de Paul wrote the song "Don't You Remember"... This was backed by yet another Sammy Fain classic "That Old Feeling"". The French music site Purebreak charts mentions the song and album as of Lynn's most important releases. The German radio station, Radio Rund Hamm, listed its release on its pop history site.

In more recent years, the song has become popular at funerals and memorials due to the reminiscing tone and nostalgia of the lyrics.

Lynn was interviewed by Saga magazine in 2019 and mentioned recording "Don't You Remember When". A more recent article also recalled the connection between Lynn, de Paul and Starr in the recording of the song and states "Decades after she became the darling of the troops', Dame Lynn returned with a comeback single. Don't You Remember When was well received by music critics when it was released in 1976". When Lynn died in June 2020, several press obituaries mentioned the song. It was included on the We'll Meet Again (VE Day 75 Edition) album in 2020 and it reached No. 55 in the UK Albums Chart. It is mentioned in an interview with Lynn's daughter "Vera Lynn's songs, daughter and early life as We’ll Meet Again singer dies aged 103" by Aidan Milan that was featured in the British newspaper Metro, as well as in The New York Post. It is also mentioned in the June 2020 article "Paul McCartney pays tribute to Vera Lynn - and she sings Beatles songs" on The Beatles Journal site. The de Paul produced B-side "That Old Feeling" is also listed among Lynn's top 100 songs.

References

Songs written by Lynsey de Paul
Vera Lynn songs
1976 singles
Songs written by Barry Blue
1976 songs